Wageningen-Hoog is a township in the town of Wageningen in the central Netherlands, in the province of Gelderland.

Wageningen-Hoog is located alongside the Village Bennekom in the town Ede. Wageningen-Hoog is spacious with villa's in a wooded area.

References

Populated places in Gelderland
Wageningen